Abdoulaye Sow may refer to:

Abdoulaye Sekou Sow, a former Prime Minister of the African country Mali
Abdoulaye "Laye" Sow, a musician from the African country Senegal